Motozintleco may refer to:

 Motozintlecos, an ethnic group of Mexico
 Motozintleco language, a Mayan language